Legna Verdecia Rodríguez (born October 29, 1972 in Granma) is a Cuban judoka who won Olympic medals in 1996 and 2000. In a career from 1989 to 2006 she won 165 out of 187 fights, making her one of the most successful Cuban judoka in history.

References

External links
 
 

1972 births
Living people
Judoka at the 1992 Summer Olympics
Judoka at the 1996 Summer Olympics
Judoka at the 2000 Summer Olympics
Judoka at the 1991 Pan American Games
Judoka at the 1995 Pan American Games
Judoka at the 1999 Pan American Games
Olympic judoka of Cuba
Olympic gold medalists for Cuba
Olympic bronze medalists for Cuba
Olympic medalists in judo
Cuban female judoka
Medalists at the 2000 Summer Olympics
Medalists at the 1996 Summer Olympics
Pan American Games gold medalists for Cuba
Pan American Games medalists in judo
Universiade medalists in judo
Universiade bronze medalists for Cuba
Medalists at the 1999 Summer Universiade
Medalists at the 1999 Pan American Games
People from Granma Province
20th-century Cuban women
21st-century Cuban women